Lindsay Davenport and Jana Novotná were the defending champions but only Davenport competed that year with Mary Joe Fernández.

Davenport and Fernández won in the final 6–3, 6–3 against Lori McNeil and Helena Suková.

Seeds
Champion seeds are indicated in bold text while text in italics indicates the round in which those seeds were eliminated.

 Lindsay Davenport /  Mary Joe Fernández (champions)
 Lori McNeil /  Helena Suková (final)
n/a
 Lisa Raymond /  Gabriela Sabatini (semifinals)

Draw

External links
 1996 Peters International Women's Doubles Draw

Women's Doubles
Doubles